Lexus Arnel Lewis (born March 6, 1991), professionally known as Lex Luger, is an American record producer. His stage name is inspired by the WCW/WWF professional wrestler Lex Luger. He co-founded the American hip hop production team 808 Mafia with Southside. He is a member of the hip hop production duo Low Pros with A-Trak, and the VABP (Virginia Boyz Productionz), a hip hop group that he founded in high school.

Career

Early life and career beginnings 
Growing up, Luger played percussion for his church and drummed in church bands. His first introduction to music was playing drums for a number of bands at his local church where he learned about beats, measures, BPMS and bars using a DJ set where he took instrumentals and mixed them with acapellas. He then moved on to making music on the PlayStation game MTV Music Generator 3, where he started working with turntables. When Luger eventually saved enough money for an Akai MPC 2500 and established the VABP (Virginia Boyz Productionz) production crew with his high school friends, Luger began to try his hand at making high quality industry hip hop beats. After purchasing an MPC 2000 from his uncle, his friend and now collaborator Urboyblack brought Luger an unlicensed copy of FL Studio. He has also incorporated music production workstations such as Maschine and Pro Tools.

Initially spending long days experimenting with Fruity Loops and working every day after school and all day every weekend wasn't enough to jumpstart Luger's production career. He dropped out of King's Fork High School after the 10th grade to further hone his music production talents when he realized that he was able to produce song length instrumentals at a fast pace. Putting hours into honing his craft, Luger began to dramatically increase his musical output after he found that he could knock out at least 10 beats a day. He then started hearing about independent music artists gaining exposure through MySpace and started posting music on that website. Around late 2008, he began cold-emailing his beats to various rappers and posting instrumentals on his Myspace page, hoping to gain further exposure in the hip hop industry. In 2009, a then unknown rapper by the name of Waka Flocka Flame began e-mailing him back. The two later built a relationship on MySpace when Luger began sending Waka beats once every few days.

Rise to fame 
Waka expressed interest in Luger's production style when he requested a particularly vicious beat that he wanted to rap over. Luger sent Waka 40 beats, where three beats eventually ended on Waka's 2009, 'Salute Me or Shoot Me 2' mixtape.  Waka later requested some more from Luger to which he responded with hundreds more, and eventually Waka Flocka Flame flew him out to Atlanta to collaborate with him. Spending months sequestered in a basement with no internet access in Atlanta working with Waka Flocka Flame, Luger laid much of the production groundwork for Waka's debut album. Not knowing the future outcome of his career, Luger contemplated taking a second job stacking boxes in a warehouse to support his production career.  Waka later gained fame and was eventually signed to Bricksquad when his song O Lets Do It became a hit.

Waka Flocka Flame's "Hard in the Paint" was Luger's first instrumental to hit the radio waves and became a hit by May 2010. Luger was in Atlanta at the time when he first heard the song playing on the radio. While in Atlanta, Luger got a phone call from Chicago rapper and record producer Kanye West, although he did not realize who he was talking to for two hours. After realizing who it was, Luger agreed to fly to New York City to work with him. He eventually created eight backing beats for West's use, including the beat that eventually became the single H•A•M as well as the bonus cut "See Me Now" for West's 2010 album My Beautiful Dark Twisted Fantasy. Luger also got a request from Spiff of SpiffTV who contacted him to get the instrumental track of "Hard In The Paint" that eventually led Luger to build a relationship with Rick Ross as Ross wanted to do a remix for the song. This led Luger to build a relationship with Rick Ross to which he later produced B.M.F. (Blowin' Money Fast) and MC Hammer for Ross's 2010 album Teflon Don. After working with Ross, Luger achieved a career boost when he began receiving an increase in numbers of followers on Twitter. By June 2010, Luger had landed production placements from rappers Ace Hood, Soulja Boy, Chingy, Sean Garrett, and Fabolous.

As Luger's sound drifted upstream from the mixtape circuit to the mainstream hip hop, it caught the eye of numerous rappers that requested his jackhammer drum and spooky trap synth production style. He then produced tracks for a number of popular rappers including Rick Ross's Teflon Don, Waka Flocka Flame's Flockaveli, Slim Thug's Tha Thug Show and Kanye West and Jay-Z's Watch the Throne. He then went on to work with a number of other popular rap artists including Wiz Khalifa, Big Sean, Wale, Fabolous, Juicy J, Soulja Boy, Snoop Dogg and 2 Chainz as well as producing songs for a number of street famous rappers such as Fat Trel, Lil Scrappy and OJ Da Juiceman. Following his success with Waka Flocka Flame and Rick Ross, Luger then began building a relationship with Juicy J in late 2010 citing him as a musical influence as well as a music industry adviser. Juicy J eventually took Luger under his wing and the two eventually collaborated on two mixtapes with Juicy J leveraging Luger a career boost as well as to generate buzz to further get Luger's name in the hip hop industry. Luger went on to produce more than 200 songs throughout 2010 and 2011 fueling hit songs by a number of popular rappers as well as number of songs featured on an array of street and underground hip hop mixtapes.

Luger was initially affiliated with fellow Brick Squad producer Southside. The two of them formed the production team 808 Mafia in 2010, to which he later left the group the following year. During the same year at the 2011 BET Hip Hop Awards, Luger won the award for Producer of the Year.

Present career 
In February 2014, Luger joined forces with Canadian DJ/producer A-Trak under the moniker Low Pros, with the intention of releasing a collaborative project. Their first release was "Jack Tripper", a drug-addled trap song featuring Brick Squad affiliates PeeWee Longway and Young Thug, who had just risen to popularity at the time due to the success of his 2013 singles "Stoner" and "Danny Glover".

In late 2014, Luger started touring as a live act. He signed with agent Wilcox Weaver at Oklahoma City and Los Angeles based Warpath Group in September 2014 for worldwide tour bookings. In January 2015, he signed to EXYT Agency for European and Asian tour bookings. Luger has played all over the world with the set consisted of Luger and his DJ, Kino Beats. He has had solid success with this endeavor, selling thousands of tickets across the globe as he sold out an entire European tour in May 2015.

On June 27, 2015, Luger headlined Virginia' fifth annual EpicFest Hip Hop Festival in Richmond, Virginia.

On March 22, 2016, Luger released his first full length instrumental project. The project features his DJ and collaborator KinoBeats as well as his V.A.B.P. collaborators back from his early production days HighDefRazajah, UrBoyBlack and Trama.

Luger opened up about his seven year long battle with drug addiction in an interview with DJ Smallz Eyes in September 2018. Stating that he was taking the prescription medication Xanax on a daily basis and was also addicted to ecstasy and marijuana, he was hospitalized four times with one incident being nearly fatal. He claimed that he could not distinguish the world from reality for four days. Luger finally decided to get clean with help from rehab. He has been sober from all substances except alcohol since 2017.

Production style and influences 
Luger uses the digital audio workstation FL Studio, along with custom installed VST plugins, to compose his beats. He has also incorporated music production workstations such as Maschine and Pro Tools. In each of his productions, he has become known for using his signature electronic sounding build up effect in the beginning and throughout his productions. The basis for his stage name came from professional wrestler Lex Luger as well as the Luger pistol. He cites producers Dr. Dre, Shawty Redd, D. Rich, Drumma Boy, Jazze Pha, hip hop production duo The Heatmakerz, rapper Juicy J and his former group Three Six Mafia, and Harlem rap group The Diplomats as his musical influences. He self describes the creative process of making his beats coming from his inner "pain" bringing out stress and pouring his heart out when he composes his beats.

Luger is known for his strong adherence to Atlanta's trap sound making use of the Roland TR-808 kick drum, ominous synth lines, and threatening ad-libs. His austere, jackhammer, and utilitarian orchestral trap sound has been well known for his heavy use of hard hitting 808 kick drums; crisp snare drums; frantic synthesizers; spooky, sinister, and rhythmic Richard Wagner- and Danny Elfman-like bombastic ominous orchestration of synthesized brass, stringed, woodwind, and keyboard instruments commonly incorporated throughout his productions. Luger is known for his musical confluence of combining bombastic orchestral instruments, spooky synths with urban street hip hop sounds. Since his entrance into the hip hop industry, he produces with a more diverse approach further incorporating pop, R&B, as well as electronic dance as a creative deviation from his traditional trap sound into his production repertoire.

Discography 

Street album
2016: The Lex Luger Experience: The Tour Vol. 1

Collaboration albums
2014: Low Pros EP 1 (with A-Trak)
2016: 500 Grams (with Ricky Hil)
2016: 1804 (with Malcolm Anthony)
2016: GOT INSTRUMENTALS x GC54PROD 2 (with GC54PROD)
2017: GOT INSTRUMENTALS x GC54PROD 4 (with GC54PROD)
2018: GOT INSTRUMENTALS x GC54PROD 6 (with GC54PROD)

Production

Awards and nominations

References 

1991 births
Living people
1017 Brick Squad artists
African-American record producers
American hip hop record producers
American rhythm and blues keyboardists
Musicians from Atlanta
Musicians from Virginia
People from Suffolk, Virginia
Songwriters from Georgia (U.S. state)
Songwriters from Virginia
Southern hip hop musicians
Trap musicians
21st-century African-American people
FL Studio users
American electronic dance music musicians